Paulo Manuel Banha Torres (born 25 November 1971) is a Portuguese former footballer who played as a left back, currently the manager of Angolan club C.R.D. Libolo.

Playing career
Torres was born in Évora, Alentejo Region. During his career, which was spent entirely in his country and Spain, the free kick specialist played for Sporting CP (this included a very brief loan at Lisbon neighbours Atlético Clube de Portugal), S.C. Campomaiorense, UD Salamanca – spending one season each in the country's two major divisions – Rayo Vallecano, G.D. Chaves, CD Leganés, S.C.U. Torreense, F.C. Penafiel and Imortal DC, retiring at 31.

Torres was part of the Portugal national U-20 team, dubbed The Golden Generation, that won the 1991 FIFA World Youth Championship on home soil, scoring two goals through long-distance free kicks and three in total during the tournament. He also won two full caps, both in the following year.

Coaching career
Torres took up coaching immediately after retiring as a player, managing exclusively in the lower leagues in Portugal. On 29 November 2013, he was appointed as head coach of the Guinea-Bissau national team.

In September 2015, Torres received a four-match ban from the Confederation of African Football for abusing a referee during the 2017 Africa Cup of Nations qualification game against Zambia three months earlier. He was sacked in March of the following year, after a 1–3 loss to Liberia.

Torres worked in the Angolan Girabola the following seasons, successively being in charge of G.D. Interclube, Kabuscorp SCP, G.D. Sagrada Esperança and C.R.D. Libolo.

Honours

Club
Sporting CP
Taça de Portugal: 1994–95

International
Portugal
FIFA U-20 World Cup: 1991

References

External links

1971 births
Living people
People from Évora
Portuguese footballers
Association football defenders
Primeira Liga players
Liga Portugal 2 players
Segunda Divisão players
Sporting CP footballers
Atlético Clube de Portugal players
S.C. Campomaiorense players
G.D. Chaves players
S.C.U. Torreense players
F.C. Penafiel players
Imortal D.C. players
La Liga players
Segunda División players
UD Salamanca players
Rayo Vallecano players
CD Leganés players
Portugal youth international footballers
Portugal under-21 international footballers
Portugal international footballers
Portuguese expatriate footballers
Expatriate footballers in Spain
Portuguese expatriate sportspeople in Spain
Portuguese football managers
C.D. Fátima managers
Guinea-Bissau national football team managers
G.D. Interclube managers
Portuguese expatriate football managers
Expatriate football managers in Guinea-Bissau
Expatriate football managers in Angola
Portuguese expatriate sportspeople in Guinea-Bissau
Portuguese expatriate sportspeople in Angola
Sportspeople from Évora District